Pranjala Yadlapalli (born 30 March 1999) is an inactive female tennis player from India.

On 22 October 2018, she achieved a career-high singles ranking of world No. 280. On 20 August 2018, she peaked at No. 232 in the doubles rankings. Yadlapalli has won four singles and six doubles titles on the ITF Women's Circuit.

On the ITF Junior Circuit, she reached a career-high combined ranking of 15, on 4 January 2016.

Yadlapalli made her debut for India Fed Cup team in 2018, and has played her sole match in Fed Cup competition.

ITF Circuit finals

Singles: 6 (4 titles, 2 runner–ups)

Doubles: 13 (6 titles, 7 runner-ups)

External links
 
 
 

1999 births
Living people
Indian female tennis players
Racket sportspeople from Guntur
Racket sportspeople from Hyderabad, India
Tennis players at the 2018 Asian Games
Asian Games competitors for India